Tim van de Stadt, known his stage name Atmozfears, is a Dutch hardstyle artist. Atmozfears was previously a trio, consisting of Tim, Kevin Keiser and Michael Jessen, formed in 2009. By the end of 2012, Jessen had left the group. In February 2012, Atmozfears joined the hardstyle label Scantraxx Records. Atmozfears has played at such festivals as Defqon.1, The Qontinent, Q-Base and Tomorrowland.

On July 1, 2013, Scantraxx announced that Tim and Kevin had gone separate ways. Tim kept the "Atmozfears" synonym, while Kevin would end up becoming another hardstyle producer called Infrno. In 2017, Tim collaborated with Hardwell on the Hardwell & Friends Vol.1 EP on a song called "All That We Are Living For" featuring M.Bronx. In 2018, Atmozfears produced the main anthem for the Q-Base Festival, commemorating its 15th and last edition.

Discography

Albums 
 2016 
 Mini-Album

2021
 this is my story

EPs 
 2009 
 Our Destiny EP (vs. The Vision)

 2012 
 Rip The Jacker / World Of Presets
 Living for the Future EP
 Hypnotika / Don’t Let Me Down
 Black Sky (as TVDS)
 Just Let Go / Destrukto
 Another Day (as TVDS)

 2013 
 Another Day / Starscream
 Atmozfears E.P. One

 2014 
 Atmozfears E.P. Two
 Rapture EP (with Energyzed)
 She Goes EP (with Adrenalize)

 2015 
 Singularity / Madman / Never Again

 2016 
 Fabrik Of Creation / Age Of Gods (ft. Energyzed)

 2019 
 Live Loud EP (with LXCPR)

Singles 
 2008 
 The Return (with Max Force)

 2009 
 Supernatural / Inflicting You (Brainkicker presents Atmozfears)

 2011 
 Welcome 2 Hell
 Adrenaline
 Pleasure & Pain (with Lady Faith)

 2012 

 Pure Fantasy (with Adrenalize)
 For You (as TVDS)
 Bumblebee (as TVDS)
 Time Stands Still (ft. Yuna-X)
 What It’s Like (with Wildstylez)

 2013 
 Bella Nova
 State Of Mind (with In-Phase)

 2014 
 Weapons Of Love (with Da Tweekaz, ft. Popr3b3l)
 Accelerate (Official Xxlerator Anthem 2014) (with Code Black)
 Starting Over (with Code Black)
 I Need You
 Raise Your Hands (with Audiotricz)

 2015
 Reawakening (with Audiotricz)
 On Your Mark
 Release (ft. David Spekter)
 Release (Chill Mix) (ft. David Spekter)
 Gold Skies (#DB15 Official Weekend Soundtrack)
 Nature’s Gasp (with Devin Wild)
 This Is Madness (with Sub Zero Project)
 Equilibrium (Qlimax Anthem 2015)

 2016 
 Keep Me Awake (ft. David Spekter)
 What About Us (with Audiotricz)

 2017 
 Handz Up (with Audiotricz)
 Embrace the Sea (WiSH Outdoor 2017 Anthem)
 Leave It All Behind
 All That We Are Living For (with Hardwell, ft. M. Bronx)
 Come Together (with Demi Kanon)

 2018 
 Sacrifice
 City of Dragons (Midnight Mafia Anthem 2018)
 Feel Good (with Adrenalize)
 This Is Our World (with Noisecontrollers)
 POPO (with Devin Wild) (Free Download)
 The Final Mission (Q-Base 2018 Anthem)
 Yesterday (with Demi Kanon, ft. David Spekter)
 Lose It All
 Breathe (with Devin Wild, ft. David Spekter)
 Come Together (Chill Mix) (with Demi Kanon)

 2019 
 Gladiators (with Devin Wild)
 Together As One (with Sound Rush, featuring Michael Jo)
 Move Ma Body (with Demi Kanon)
 Live Loud (Official Decibel Outdoor 2019 Anthem) (with LXCPR)
 The Whistle
 Move Ma Body (Uptempo Edit) (with Demi Kanon)
 Das Boot (with Noisecontrollers and B-Front)

 2020 
 Keep Your Eyes Open (with Jesse Jax) (Free Download)
 my story
 Accelerate - Chill Mix (with Code Black)
 darkness (with Villain)
 All Or Nothing (with Code Black and Toneshifterz)
 Breathe 2020 (with Devin Wild, featuring David Spekter)
 home

 2021 
 One In A Million (with Code Black, featuring David Spekter)
 Lost With You (with Refuzion)
 Ghosts (with Demi Kanon, featuring David Spekter)
 Come Back Home (with Sound Rush)
 Darkness (with Villain)
 Country Roads (with Sound Rush)

Album- and compilation featurings 
 2012 
 Distortion Fields (with Inner Heat; on Inner Heat - 2 Gether EP)
 Restart (on Headhunterz − Hard With Style)

 2013 
 Unexpected (with Phuture Noize; on Phuture Noize − Music Rules The Noize)

 2015 
 Can You Feel It (with Carnage & Ty Dolla Sign; on Carnage − Papi Gordo)

 2017 
 Push It Back (with Sub Sonik; on Sub Sonik − Strike One)
 Talk Facts (with Bodyshock; on Bodyshock − Riot & Rise Pt.2)

 2018 
 You & Me (with Toneshifterz; on Toneshifterz − Shifting To The Source)

 2020 
 Way of The Wicked (with Audiotricz, ft. MC DL; on Audiotricz − A New Dawn)
 To War (with Sub Sonik; on Sub Sonik - Kings Never Die)
 Crazy (with Sound Rush; on Sound Rush - Brothers)

Remixes 
 2012 
 The Prophet - Really Don’t Care

 2013 
 Wildstylez - Delay Distortion
 Fedde Le Grand & Nicky Romero ft. Matthew Koma - Sparks (Turn Off Your Mind) (with Audiotricz)
 Phuture Noize - Fadin’

 2014 
 Tritonal & Paris Blohm ft. Sterling Fox - Colors
 Bass Modulators - Bounce & Break

 2016 
 Darren Styles - Come Running

 2018 
 Headhunterz - Psychedelic (on Headhunterz - The Art Of Remixes EP)

 2019 
 San Holo - I Still See Your Face (Free Download)

 2020 
 San Holo - Brighter Days

 2021 
 Topmodelz - Your Love (with Sound Rush)

References

External links
 Official website

Monstercat artists
Hardstyle musicians
1992 births
Living people